William Henry Fogg (9 March 1903 – 29 July 1966) was a professional footballer, who played for Tranmere Rovers, Bangor City, Huddersfield Town, Clapton Orient and New Brighton. He was born in Birkenhead, Cheshire (now in Merseyside).

Early career
Fogg started his career at Tranmere Rovers, scoring on his league debut against Ashington in a Football League Third Division North match in January 1925. In May 1926 he moved to Bangor City, appearing in the 1928 Welsh Cup Final, which Bangor lost 2–0.

Huddersfield Town
In May 1928 he switched to Huddersfield Town for a fee of £20. He appeared in all of Huddersfield's FA Cup matches in 1929–30, until he was injured in the semi-final. Despite having to miss the final, he still received a runner-up medal.

Clapton Orient
Fogg joined Football League Third Division South club Clapton Orient on 16 August 1933, playing in 86 senior matches. He scored twice for the club, once in a 3–2 league defeat at home to Watford on 21 April 1934, and again in a 2–1 league defeat at Southend United on 28 September 1935.

After three seasons he was transferred to New Brighton on 20 August 1936, where he played in 77 senior matches, scoring once.

He died aged 63 in Barnston, Cheshire (also now in Merseyside).

References

1903 births
1966 deaths
English footballers
Sportspeople from Birkenhead
Association football midfielders
English Football League players
Tranmere Rovers F.C. players
Bangor City F.C. players
Huddersfield Town A.F.C. players
Leyton Orient F.C. players
New Brighton A.F.C. players